Water metering is the practice of measuring water use. Water meters measure the volume of water used by residential and commercial building units that are supplied with water by a public water supply system. They are also used to determine flow through a particular portion of the system.

In most of the world water meters are calibrated in cubic metres (m3) or litres, but in the United States and some other countries water meters are calibrated in cubic feet (ft.3) or US gallons on a mechanical or electronic register. Modern meters typically can display rate-of-flow in addition to total volume.

Several types of water meters are in common use, and may be characterized by the flow measurement method, the type of end-user, the required flow rates, and accuracy requirements.

In North America, standards for manufacturing water meters are set by the American Water Works Association. Outside of North America, most countries use ISO standards.

Types of metering devices
There are two common approaches to flow measurement: displacement and velocity, each making use of a variety of technologies. Common displacement designs include oscillating piston and nutating disc meters. Velocity-based designs include single- and multi-jet meters and turbine meters.

There are also non-mechanical designs, for example, electromagnetic and ultrasonic meters, and meters designed for special uses. Most meters in a typical water distribution system are designed to measure cold potable water only. Specialty hot water meters are designed with materials that can withstand higher temperatures. Meters for reclaimed water have special lavender register covers to signify that the water should not be used for drinking.

Additionally, there are electromechanical meters, like prepaid water meters and automatic meter reading meters. The latter integrates an electronic measurement component and a LCD with a mechanical water meter. Mechanical water meters normally use a reed switch, hall or photoelectric coding register as the signal output. After processing by the microcontroller unit (MCU) in the electronic module, the data are transmitted to the LCD or output to an information management system.

Water meters are generally owned, read and maintained by a public water provider such as a city, rural water association or private water company. In some cases an owner of a mobile home park, apartment complex or commercial building may be billed by a utility based on the reading of one meter, with the costs shared among the tenants based on some sort of key (size of flat, number of inhabitants or by separately tracking the water consumption of each unit in what is called submetering).

Displacement water meters

Displacement meters are commonly referred to as Positive Displacement, or "PD" meters. Two common types are oscillating piston meters and nutating disk meters. Either method relies on the water to physically displace the moving measuring element in direct proportion to the amount of water that passes through the meter. The piston or disk moves a magnet that drives the register.

PD meters are generally very accurate at the low-to-moderate flow rates typical of residential and small commercial users and commonly range in size from 5/8" to 2". Because displacement meters require that all water flows through the meter to "push" the measuring element, they generally are not practical in large commercial applications requiring high flow rates or low-pressure loss. PD meters normally have a built-in strainer to protect the measuring element from rocks or other debris that could stop or break the measuring element. PD meters normally have bronze, brass or plastic bodies with internal measuring chambers made of moulded plastics and stainless steel.

Velocity water meters

A velocity-type meter measures the velocity of flow through a meter of known internal capacity. The speed of the flow can then be converted into a volume of flow to determine the usage. There are several types of meters that measure water flow velocity, including jet meters (single-jet and multi-jet), turbine meters, propeller meters and mag meters. Most velocity-based meters have an adjustment vane for calibrating the meter to the required accuracy.

Multi-jet meters
Multi-jet meters are very accurate in small sizes and are commonly used in ⅝" to 2" sizes for residential and small commercial users. Multi-jet meters use multiple ports surrounding an internal chamber to create multiple jets of water against an impeller, whose rotation speed depends on the velocity of water flow. Multi-jets are very accurate at low flow rates, but there are no large size meters since they do not have the straight-through flow path needed for the high flow rates used in large pipe diameters.  Multi-jet meters generally have an internal strainer element that can protect the jet ports from getting clogged. Multi-jet meters normally have bronze alloy bodies or outer casings, with internal measuring parts made from modern thermoplastics and stainless steel.

Turbine meters
Turbine meters are less accurate than displacement and jet meters at low flow rates, but the measuring element does not occupy or severely restrict the entire path of flow. The flow direction is generally straight through the meter, allowing for higher flow rates and less pressure loss than displacement-type meters. They are the meter of choice for large commercial users, fire protection and as master meters for the water distribution system.  Strainers are generally required to be installed in front of the meter to protect the measuring element from gravel or other debris that could enter the water distribution system. Turbine meters are generally available for 1-½" to 12" or higher pipe sizes. Turbine meter bodies are commonly made of bronze, cast iron or ductile iron. Internal turbine elements can be plastic or non-corrosive metal alloys. They are accurate in normal working conditions but are greatly affected by the flow profile and fluid conditions.

Fire meters are a specialized type of turbine meter meeting the high flow rates requirements for fire protection. They are often approved by Underwriters Laboratories (UL) or Factory Mutual (FM) for use in fire protection.
Fire hydrant meters are a specialized type of portable turbine meter attached to a fire hydrant to measure water flowing out of the hydrant. The meters are normally made of aluminium to keep their weight low and usually have a 3" capacity. Utilities often require them for measuring water used on construction sites, for pool filling, or where a permanent meter has not yet been installed.

Compound meters
A compound meter is used where high flow rates are necessary, but where at times there are also smaller rates of flow that need to be accurately measured. Compound meters have two measuring elements and a check valve to regulate flow between them. At high flow rates, water is normally diverted primarily or completely to the high flow element. The high flow element is typically a turbine meter. When flow rates drop to where the high flow element cannot measure accurately, a check valve closes to divert water to a smaller element that can measure the lower flow rates accurately. The low flow element is typically a multi-jet or PD meter. By adding the values registered by the high and low elements, the utility has a record of the total consumption of water flowing through the meter.

Electromagnetic meters

Magnetic flow meters, commonly referred to as "mag meters", are technically a velocity-type water meter, except that they use electromagnetic properties to determine the water flow velocity, rather than the mechanical means used by jet and turbine meters. Mag meters use the physics principle of Faraday's law of induction for measurement and require AC or DC electricity from a power line or battery to operate the electromagnets. Since mag meters have no mechanical measuring element, they normally have the advantage of being able to measure flow in either direction, and use electronics for measuring and totalizing the flow. Mag meters can also be useful for measuring raw (untreated/unfiltered) water and waste-water since there is no mechanical measuring element to get clogged or damaged by debris flowing through the meter. Strainers are not required with mag meters since there is no measuring element in the stream of flow that could be damaged. Since stray electrical energy flowing through the flow tube can cause inaccurate readings, most mag meters are installed with either grounding rings or grounding electrodes to divert stray electricity away from the electrodes used to measure the flow inside the flow tube.

Ultrasonic meters
Ultrasonic water meters use one or more ultrasonic transducer to send ultrasonic sound waves through the fluid to determine the velocity of the water.  Since the cross-sectional area of the meter body is a fixed and known value, when the velocity of water is detected, the volume of water passing through the meter can be calculated with very high accuracy.  Because of water density changes with temperature, most ultrasonic water meters also measure the water temperature as a component of the volume calculation.

There are 2 primary ultrasonic measurement technologies used in water metering:

 Doppler effect meters which utilize the Doppler Effect to determine the velocity of water passing through the meter.
 Transit Time meters which measure the amount of time required for the ultrasonic signal to pass between 2 or more fixed points inside the meter.

Ultrasonic meters may either be of flow-through or "clamp-on" design.  Flow-through designs are those where the water passes directly through the meter, and are typically found in residential or commercial applications.  Clamp-on designs are generally used for larger diameters where the sensors are mounted to the exterior of pipes, etc.

Ultrasonic water meters are typically very accurate (if built in), with residential meters capable of measuring down to 0.01 gallons or 0.001 cubic feet.  In addition, they have wide flow measurement ranges, require little maintenance and have long lifespans due to the lack of internal mechanical components to wear out.  While relatively new to the American water utility market, ultrasonic meters have been used in commercial applications for many years and are becoming widely accepted due to their advantages over traditional mechanical designs.

Prepaid water meters
Meters can be prepaid or postpaid, depending on the payment method. Most mechanical type water meters are of the postpaid type, as are electromagnetic and ultrasonic meters. With prepaid water meters, the user purchases and prepays for a given amount of water from a vending station. The amount of water credited is entered on media such as an IC or RF type card. The main difference is whether the card needs contact with the processing part of the prepaid water meter. In some areas, a prepaid water meter uses a keypad as the interface for inputting the water credit.

Registers

There are several types of registers on water meters. A standard register normally has a dial similar to a clock, with gradations around the perimeter to indicate the measuring unit and the amount of water used, if less than the lowest digit in a display similar to the odometer wheels in a car, their sum is the total volume used. Modern registers are normally driven by a magnetic coupling between a magnet in the measuring chamber attached to the measuring element and another attached to the bottom of the register. Gears in the register convert the motion of the measuring element to the proper usage increment for display on the sweep hand and the odometer-style wheels. Many registers also have a leak detector. This is a small visible disk or hand that is geared closer to the rotation speed of the drive magnet, so that very small flows that would be visually undetectable on the regular sweep hand can be seen.

With Automatic Meter Reading, manufacturers have developed pulse or encoder registers to produce electronic output for radio transmitters, reading storage devices, and data logging devices. Pulse meters send a digital or analog electronic pulse to a recording device. Encoder registers have an electronic means permitting an external device to interrogate the register to obtain either the position of the wheels or a stored electronic reading. Frequent transmissions of consumption data can be used to give smart meter functionality.

There are also some specialized types of registers such as meters with an LCD instead of mechanical wheels, and registers to output data or pulses to a variety of recording and controller devices. For industrial applications, the output is often 4-20 mA analog for recording or controlling different flow rates in addition to totalization.

Water meter reading
Different size meters indicate different resolutions of the reading. One rotation of the sweep hand may be equivalent to 10 gallons or to 1,000 gallons (1 to 100 ft.3, 0.1 to 10 m3). If one rotation of the hand represents 10 gallons, the meter has a 10-gallon sweep. Sometimes the last number(s) of the wheel display are non-rotating or printed on the dial face. The fixed zero number(s) are represented by the position of the rotating sweep hand. For example, if one rotation of the hand is 10 gallons, the sweep hand is on 7, and the wheel display shows 123456 plus a fixed zero, the actual total usage would be 1,234,567 gallons.

In the United States most utilities bill only to the nearest 100 or 1,000 gallons (10 to 100 ft.3, 1 to 10 m3), and often only read the leftmost 4 or 5 numbers on the display wheels. Using the above example, they would read and bill 1,234, rounding to 1,234,000 gallons based on a 1,000-gallon billing resolution. The most common rounding for a particular size meter is often indicated by differently coloured number wheels, the ones ignored being black, and the ones used for billing being white.

Prevalence

Water metering is common for residential and commercial drinking water supply in many countries, as well as for industrial self-supply with water. However, it is less common in irrigated agriculture, which is the major water user worldwide. Water metering is also uncommon for piped drinking water supply in rural areas and small towns, although there are examples of successful metering in rural areas in developing countries, such as in El Salvador.

Metering of water supplied by utilities to residential, commercial and industrial users is common in most developed countries, except for the United Kingdom where only about 52% of users are metered. In some developing countries metering is very common, such as in Chile where it stands at 96%, while in others it still remains low, such as in Argentina.

The percentage of residential water metering in selected cities in developing countries is as follows:

 99% in Santiago de Chile (1998)
 96% in Abidjan, Ivory Coast (1987)
 62% in cities in Guatemala (2000)
 30% in Lima, Peru (1991)
 28% in Kathmandu, Nepal (2001)
  2% in Buenos Aires, Argentina (1992)

Nearly two-thirds of OECD countries meter more than 90% of single-family houses. A few are also expanding their metering of apartments (e.g., France and Germany).

Benefits
The benefits of metering are that:

 in conjunction with volumetric pricing it provides an incentive for water conservation,
 it helps to detect water leaks in the distribution network, thus providing a basis for reducing the amount of non-revenue water;
 it is a precondition for quantity-targeting of water subsidies to the poor.

Costs
The costs of metering include:

 Investment costs to purchase, install and replace meters, 
 Recurring costs to read meters and issue bills based on consumption instead of bills based on monthly flat fees.

While the cost of purchasing residential meters is low, the total life cycle costs of metering are high. For example, retrofitting flats in large buildings with meters for every flat can involve major and thus costly plumbing work.

Problems
Problems associated with metering arise particularly in the case of intermittent supply, which is common in many developing countries. Sudden changes in pressure can damage meters to the extent that many meters in cities in developing countries are not functional. Also, some types of meters become less accurate as they age, and under-registering consumption leads to lower revenues if defective meters are not regularly replaced. Many types of meters also register air flows, which can lead to over-registration of consumption, especially in systems with intermittent supply, when water supply is re-established and the incoming water pushes air through the meters.

Water meters do not distinguish between air and water both are counted as fluid. There are two regulations where water companies and meter manufacturers do not comply and charge air for water. A measuring system shall be equipped with an effective air/vapor eliminator or other automatic means to prevent the passage of air/vapor through the meter. ref.[Handbook 44 – 2019 3.30.  S.2.1.] Measuring systems shall incorporate a gas elimination device for the proper elimination of any air or undissolved gases which may be contained in the liquid before it enters the meter.

Effect on consumption
There is disagreement as to the effect of metering and water pricing on water consumption. The price elasticity of metered water demand varies greatly depending on local conditions. The effect of volumetric water pricing on consumption tends to be higher if the water bill represents a significant portion of household expenditures. 

There is evidence from the UK that there is an instant drop in consumption of some 10% when meters are installed, although in most instances consumption isn't directly measured prior to meter installation, so the benefits are uncertain. Whilst metered water users in the UK do use less than unmetered users, in most areas metering is not compulsory for homes built before 1990, so the metered customers are to some extent a self-selecting group. There is also concern that water metering could be socially regressive, as householders on low incomes are less able to invest in water efficiency measures and may experience water poverty (defined as when a household spends more than 3% of net income on water and sewage services). 

In Hamburg, Germany, domestic water consumption for metered flats (112 liter/capita/day) was 18% lower than for unmetered flats (137 liter/capita/day) in 1992.

See also

 Advanced Metering Infrastructure
 American Water Works Association
 Automated meter reading
 Curb box
 Drinking water
 Electricity Meter
 Flow measurement
 Gas meter
 Meter Data Management
 Public utility
 Residential water use
 Utility submeter
 Water conservation

References

Further reading
 American Water Works Association Manual of Water Supply Practices Manual M6, Water Meters — Selection, Installation, Testing, and Maintenance, 
 American Water Works Association standards C700-02: Cold-Water Meters—Displacement Type, Bronze Main Case
 American Water Works Association standards C701-02: Cold-Water Meters—Turbine Type
 American Water Works Association standards C702-01: Cold-Water Meters—Compound Type
 American Water Works Association standards C703-96: Cold-Water Meters—Fire Service Type
 American Water Works Association standards C707-05: Encoder-Type Remote-Registration Systems for Cold-Water Meters
 American Water Works Association standards C708-05: Cold-Water Meters Multijet Type

External links
Manual Water Meters http://watflux.in/manual-water-meters/

 Water Measurement Manual of the United States Bureau of Reclamation
 How to read different size water meters (PDF file)
 How Meter Keeps Tab On The Water You Use, Popular Science, July 1950 very detailed article with good illustrations
 Typical Prepaid water meter introduction(PDF file)
 Kosher Smart Water Meters

Flow meters
Public services
Water industry
Water supply
Water technology